Ptychopyxis bacciformis is a species of flowering plant in the family Euphorbiaceae, native to Vietnam to Sumatra and the Philippines. It was first described by Léon Croizat in 1942.

Distribution
Ptychopyxis bacciformis is native to Borneo, Peninsular Malaysia, the Philippines, Sumatra and Vietnam.

Conservation
Ptychopyxis triradiata was assessed as "vulnerable" in the 1998 IUCN Red List, where it is said to be native only to Peninsular Malaysia. , Pt. triradiata was regarded as a synonym of Ptychopyxis bacciformis, which has a wider distribution.

References

Pycnocomeae
Flora of Borneo
Flora of Malaya
Flora of the Philippines
Flora of Sumatra
Flora of Vietnam
Plants described in 1942